Toi is an imperative, type-sensitive language that provides the basic functionality of a programming language. The language was designed and developed from the ground-up by Paul Longtine. Written in C, Toi was created with the intent to be an educational experience and serves as a learning tool (or toy, hence the name) for those looking to familiarize themselves with the inner-workings of a programming language.

Specification

Types 
 0 VOID    - Null, no data
 1 ADDR    - Address type (bytecode)
 2 TYPE    - A `type` type
 3 PLIST   - Parameter list
 4 FUNC    - Function
 5 OBJBLDR - Object builder
 6 OBJECT  - Object/Class
 7 G_PTR   - Generic pointer
 8 G_INT   - Generic integer
 9 G_FLOAT - Generic double
 10 G_CHAR  - Generic character
 11 G_STR   - Generic string
 12 S_ARRAY - Static array
 13 D_ARRAY - Dynamic array
 14 H_TABLE - Hashtable
 15 G_FIFO  - Stack

Runtime

Runtime context definition 

The runtime context keeps track of an individual threads metadata, such as:

 The operating stack
 The operating stack where current running instructions push/pop to.
 refer to STACK DEFINITION
 Namespace instance
 Data structure that holds the references to variable containers, also proving the interface for Namespace Levels.
 refer to NAMESPACE DEFINITION
 Argument stack
 Arguments to function calls are pushed on to this stack, flushed on call.
 refer to STACK DEFINITION, FUNCTION DEFINITION
 Program counter
 An interface around bytecode to keep track of traversing line-numbered instructions.
 refer to PROGRAM COUNTER DEFINITION

This context gives definition to an 'environment' where code is executed.

Namespace definition 

A key part to any operational computer language is the notion of a 'Namespace'.
This notion of a 'Namespace' refers to the ability to declare a name, along with
needed metadata, and call upon the same name to retrieve the values associated
with that name.

In this definition, the namespace will provide the following key mechanisms:

 Declaring a name
 Assigning a name to a value
 Retrieving a name's value
 Handle a name's scope
 Implicitly move in/out of scopes

The scope argument is a single byte, where the format is as follows:

 Namespace|Scope
 0000000  |0

Scopes are handled by referencing to either the Global Scope or the Local Scope.
The Local Scope is denoted by '0' in the scope argument when referring to names,
and this scope is initialized when evaluating any new block of code. When a different block of code is called, a new scope is added as a new Namespace level. Namespace levels act as context switches within function contexts. For example, the local namespace must be 'returned to' if that local namespace context needs to be preserved on return. Pushing 'Namespace levels' ensures that for every n function calls, you can traverse n instances of previous namespaces. For example, take this namespace level graphic, where each Level is a namespace instance:

 Level 0: Global namespace, LSB == '1'.
 Level 1: Namespace level, where Local Level is at 1, LSB == '0'.

When a function is called, another namespace level is created and the local
level increases, like so:

 Level 0: Global namespace, LSB == '1'.
 Level 1: Namespace level.
 Level 2: Namespace level, where Local Level is at 2, LSB == '0'.

Global scope names (LSB == 1 in the scope argument) are persistent through the runtime as they handle all function definitions, objects, and
names declared in the global scope. The "Local Level" is at where references
that have a scope argument of '0' refer to when accessing names.

The Namespace argument refers to which Namespace the variable exists in.
When the namespace argument equals 0, the current namespace is referenced.
The global namespace is 1 by default, and any other namespaces must be declared
by using the

Variable definition 

Variables in this definition provide the following mechanisms:

 Provide a distinguishable area of typed data
 Provide a generic container around typed data, to allow for labeling
 Declare a set of fundamental datatypes, and methods to:
 Allocate the proper space of memory for the given data type,
 Deallocate the space of memory a variables data may take up, and
 Set in place a notion of ownership

For a given variable V, V defines the following attributes

    V -> Ownership
    V -> Type
    V -> Pointer to typed space in memory

Each variable then can be handled as a generic container.

In the previous section, the notion of Namespace levels was introduced. Much
like how names are scoped, generic variable containers must communicate their
scope in terms of location within a given set of scopes. This is what is called
'Ownership'. In a given runtime, variable containers can exist in the following
structures: A stack instance, Bytecode arguments, and Namespaces

The concept of ownership differentiates variables existing on one or more of the
structures. This is set in place to prevent accidental deallocation of variable
containers that are not copied, but instead passed as references to these
structures.

Function definition 

Functions in this virtual machine are a pointer to a set of instructions in a
program with metadata about parameters defined.

Object definition 

In this paradigm, objects are units that encapsulate a separate namespace and
collection of methods.

Bytecode spec 

Bytecode is arranged in the following order:

   <opcode>, <arg 0>, <arg 1>, <arg 2>

Where the <opcode> is a single byte denoting which subroutine to call with the
following arguments when executed. Different opcodes have different argument
lengths, some having 0 arguments, and others having 3 arguments.

Interpreting Bytecode Instructions 

A bytecode instruction is a single-byte opcode, followed by at maximum 3
arguments, which can be in the following forms:

 Static (single byte)
 Name (single word)
 Address (depending on runtime state, usually a word)
 Dynamic (size terminated by NULL, followed by (size)*bytes of data)
 i.e. FF FF 00 <0xFFFF bytes of data>,
       01 00 <0x1 bytes of data>,
       06 00 <0x6 bytes of data>, etc.

Below is the specification of all the instructions with a short description for
each instruction, and instruction category:

Opcode 

Keywords:
 TOS           - 'Top Of Stack' The top element
 TBI           - 'To be Implemented'
 S<[variable]> - Static Argument.
 N<[variable]> - Name.
 A<[variable]> - Address Argument.
 D<[variable]> - Dynamic bytecode argument.

 Hex | Memnonic | arguments - description

Stack manipulation 

    These subroutines operate on the current-working stack(1).

 10 POP S<n>  - pops the stack n times.
 11 ROT       - rotates top of stack
 12 DUP       - duplicates the top of the stack
 13 ROT_THREE - rotates top three elements of stack

Variable management 
 20 DEC S<scope> S<type> N - declare variable of type
 21 LOV S<scope> N - loads reference variable on to stack
 22 STV S<scope> N - stores TOS to reference variable
 23 CTV S<scope> N D<data> - loads constant into variable
 24 CTS D<data>                 - loads constant into stack

Type management 

Types are in the air at this moment. I'll detail what types there are when
the time comes

 30 TYPEOF       - pushes type of TOS on to the stack                        TBI
 31 CAST S<type> - Tries to cast TOS to <type>                               TBI

Binary Ops 

OPS take the two top elements of the stack, perform an operation and push
the result on the stack.

 40 ADD  - adds
 41 SUB  - subtracts
 42 MULT - multiplies
 43 DIV  - divides 
 44 POW  - power, TOS^TOS1                                                   TBI
 45 BRT  - base root, TOS root TOS1                                          TBI
 46 SIN  - sine                                                              TBI
 47 COS  - cosine                                                            TBI
 48 TAN  - tangent                                                           TBI 
 49 ISIN - inverse sine                                                      TBI
 4A ICOS - inverse consine                                                   TBI
 4B ITAN - inverse tangent                                                   TBI
 4C MOD  - modulus                                                           TBI
 4D OR   - or's                                                              TBI
 4E XOR  - xor's                                                             TBI
 4F NAND - and's                                                             TBI

Conditional Expressions 

Things for comparison, < > = ! and so on and so forth.
Behaves like Arithmetic instructions, besides NOT instruction. Pushes boolean
to TOS

 50 GTHAN    - Greater than
 51 LTHAN    - Less than
 52 GTHAN_EQ - Greater than or equal to
 53 LTHAN_EQ - Less than or equal to
 54 EQ       - Equal to
 55 NEQ      - Not equal to
 56 NOT      - Inverts TOS if TOS is boolean
 57 OR       - Boolean OR
 58 AND      - Boolean AND

Loops 
 60 STARTL - Start of loop
 61 CLOOP  - Conditional loop. If TOS is true, continue looping, else break
 6E BREAK  - Breaks out of loop
 6F ENDL   - End of loop

Code flow 

These instructions dictate code flow.

 70 GOTO A<addr> - Goes to address
 71 JUMPF A<n>   - Goes forward <n> lines
 72 IFDO         - If TOS is TRUE, do until done, if not, jump to done
 73 ELSE         - Chained with an IFDO statement, if IFDO fails, execute ELSE
                   block until DONE is reached.
 74 JTR          - jump-to-return.                                           TBI
 75 JTE          - jump-to-error. Error object on TOS                        TBI
 7D ERR          - Start error block, uses TOS to evaluate error             TBI
 7E DONE         - End of block
 7F CALL N - Calls function, pushes return value on to STACK.

Generic object interface. Expects object on TOS 
 80 GETN N<name>   - Returns variable associated with name in object
 81 SETN N<name>   - Sets the variable associated with name in object
                     Object on TOS, Variable on TOS1
 82 CALLM N<name>  - Calls method in object
 83 INDEXO         - Index an object, uses argument stack
 84 MODO S<OP>     - Modify an object based on op. [+, -, *, /, %, ^ .. etc.]

F - Functions/classes 

 FF DEFUN NS<type> D<args> - Un-funs everything. no, no- it defines a
                                   function. D is its name, S<type> is
                                   the return value, D<args> is the args.

 FE DECLASS ND<args>       - Defines a class.
 FD DENS S                 - Declares namespace
 F2 ENDCLASS               - End of class block
 F1 NEW S<scope> N         - Instantiates class
 F0 RETURN                 - Returns from function

Special Bytes 
 00 NULL          - No-op
 01 LC N<name>    - Calls OS function library, i.e. I/O, opening files, etc.  TBI
 02 PRINT         - Prints whatever is on the TOS.
 03 DEBUG         - Toggle debug mode
 0E ARGB          - Builds argument stack
 0F PC S          - Primitive call, calls a subroutine A. A list of     TBI
                    primitive subroutines providing methods to tweak
                    objects this bytecode set cannot touch. Uses argstack.

Compiler/Translator/Assembler

Lexical analysis 

Going from code to bytecode is what this section is all about. First off an
abstract notation for the code will be broken down into a binary tree as so:

                                    <node>
                                      /\
                                     /  \
                                    /    \
                                  <arg> <next>

node> can be an argument of its parent node, or the next instruction.
Instruction nodes are nodes that will produce an instruction, or multiple based
on the bytecode interpretation of its instruction. For example, this line of
code:

                                   int x = 3

would translate into:
                                      def
                                       /\
                                      /  \
                                     /    \
                                    /      \
                                   /        \
                                 int        set
                                 /\          /\
                                /  \        /  \
                              null 'x'    'x'  null
                                          /\
                                         /  \
                                       null  3

Functions are expressed as individual binary trees. The root of any file is
treated as an individual binary tree, as this is also a function.

The various instruction nodes are as follows:

 def <type> <name>
 Define a named space in memory with the type specified
 See the 'TYPES' section under 'OVERVIEW'
 set <name> <value>
 Set a named space in memory with value specified

Going from Binary Trees to Bytecode 

The various instruction nodes within the tree will call specific functions
that will take arguments specified and lookahead and lookbehind to formulate the
correct bytecode equivalent.

Developer's Website 
The developer of the language, Paul Longtine, operates a publicly available website and blog called banna.tech, named after his online alias 'banna'.

References

Specification